In the run-up to the 1987 general election, various organisations carried out opinion polling to gauge voting intention. Results of such polls are displayed in this article. The date range for these opinion polls are from the 1983 general election until 10 June 1987.

Polling results 
All Data from UK polling Report

1987

1986

1985

1984

1983

References 

1987 United Kingdom general election
Opinion polling for United Kingdom general elections